The 8L90 is an eight-speed automatic transmission built by General Motors.  It is designed for use in longitudinal engine applications either attached to the front-located engine with a standard bell housing or in the rear of the car adjacent to the differential (as in the Corvette). It is a hydraulic (hydramatic) design.  GM also produces a similar design with the smaller 8L45.

The 8L90 is the subject of a class-action lawsuit filed in December 2018 that alleges the transmission suffers from persistent "shudder" issues and that GM has known about the problems since its introduction and has failed to provide a solution, instead choosing to wait until the unit is out of warranty.

Specifications

Applications

References

External links
General Motors Powertrain Division

Automatic transmission tradenames
8L90